Walnut Hill is an unincorporated community in Escambia County, Florida, United States, located  west-southwest of Century.

References

Unincorporated communities in Escambia County, Florida
Unincorporated communities in Florida